Savar-e Vasat (also Romanized as Savār-e Vasaţ) is a village in Zavkuh Rural District, Pishkamar District, Kalaleh County, Golestan Province, Iran. At the 2006 census, its population was 155, in 33 families.

References 

Populated places in Kalaleh County